Thelocactus hexaedrophorus is a species of cactus. It is endemic to Mexico.

References

hexaedrophorus
Flora of Mexico
Least concern plants